Rocío Campigli (born 6 August 1994) is an Argentine handball player for Club Balonmano Femenino Málaga Costa del Sol and the Argentina women's national handball team. She is a former player of Estudiantes

She defended at the 2015 World Women's Handball Championship in Denmark.

Individual awards and achievements
She defended Argentina at the 2016 Summer Olympics. Her nicknames are "La Roca " and "La negra " and her favourite relative is her cousin, Gonzalo Campigli, as he has taught her many things about sport and training.

Best pivot
2016 Pan American Women's Club Handball Championship

References

External links

Argentine female handball players
1994 births
Living people
Sportspeople from Buenos Aires
Argentine people of Italian descent
Handball players at the 2016 Summer Olympics
Olympic handball players of Argentina
Pan American Games medalists in handball
Pan American Games silver medalists for Argentina
Handball players at the 2015 Pan American Games
Handball players at the 2019 Pan American Games
South American Games silver medalists for Argentina
South American Games medalists in handball
Expatriate handball players
Argentine expatriate sportspeople in Spain
Competitors at the 2018 South American Games
Medalists at the 2019 Pan American Games
Medalists at the 2015 Pan American Games
21st-century Argentine women